Tunku Putra School, the first international school in Sarawak, Malaysia, was founded in 1996 by Cahya Mata Sarawak Berhad (CMSB) in honor of the country's first Prime Minister,  Tunku Abdul Rahman Putra Al-Haj. Over the past 25 years, the school has flourished, attracting students from over 20 different nationalities and now has a student body of over 600.

In March 2018, CMSB partnered with the HELP Education Services and Ibraco Berhad to take the school to new heights of educational excellence. This collaboration resulted in the establishment of Tunku Putra-HELP in Kuching, a purpose-built campus located in the NorthBank area of Tabuan Jaya, the bustling residential hub of Kuching.

The new campus is designed to accommodate up to 1,500 students, which is more than double the current student population. With state-of-the-art facilities, a highly qualified faculty, and an innovative approach to education, Tunku Putra-HELP is well-equipped to prepare students for success in the 21st century. The school offers a broad range of academic programs, including the International Primary Curriculum (IPC), the International General Certificate of Secondary Education (IGCSE), and the Cambridge A-Level program.

Moreover, Tunku Putra-HELP provides a holistic learning experience, emphasizing not just academic excellence but also personal growth and development. The school offers a diverse range of co-curricular activities, including sports, music, drama, and community service, designed to foster students' social skills and leadership qualities.

In conclusion, Tunku Putra School's collaboration with HELP Education Group and Ibraco Berhad has marked a significant milestone in the school's journey towards academic excellence. With its state-of-the-art facilities and holistic approach to education, Tunku Putra-HELP is well-positioned to provide students with the knowledge, skills, and experiences they need to succeed in the 21st century.

Notable former pupils
 Kiyoshi Aihara — Hitz FM radio announcer 
 Asly Chua — sprinter

References

External links
 Official Website

International schools in Malaysia
Schools in Sarawak
Educational institutions established in 1997
1997 establishments in Malaysia